This is a bibliography of Holyoke, a city in Massachusetts, with books about the area's history, culture, geography, and people. Due to the area's proximity to a number of industrial developments and the numerous cultures of different waves of immigrant workers, a wide number of books, dissertations, and comprehensive articles have been written about Holyoke throughout its history in several languages. This list is not intended to be complete, authoritative, or exhaustive and does not include promotional material, travel guides, recipe books, directories, or the catalogs of industrial companies that have resided therein.

Nonfiction

Architecture and engineering

Culture and ethnicity

General history

Academic case studies

Anniversarial histories

Periodical articles

Law and government

Fiction

See also
 Good Housekeeping, originally established in Holyoke
 Holyoke Transcript-Telegram, the city's defunct newspaper of record
 The Nautilus, New Thought periodical published in Holyoke
 Bibliography of Boston
 History of papermaking in Massachusetts

References

External links

 Holyoke History Room, Holyoke Public Library
 Milan P. Warner Photograph Collection
 C. P. Wilhelm Collection
 Archives and Special Collections, Wistariahurst Museum
 Special Collections and University Archives, University of Massachusetts Amherst
 American Writing Paper Company Records
 Carlos Vega Collection
 United Congregation Church of Holyoke Records

holyoke
Holyoke, Massachusetts
Massachusetts-related lists
holyoke
holyoke
Mass media in Hampden County, Massachusetts
Holyoke